

This is a list of the National Register of Historic Places listings in Kansas City, Missouri.

This is intended to be a complete list of the properties and districts on the National Register of Historic Places in the Jackson County portions of Kansas City, Missouri, United States. Latitude and longitude coordinates are provided for many National Register properties and districts; these locations may be seen together in an online map.

There are 385 properties and districts listed on the National Register in Jackson County, including 4 National Historic Landmarks. The city of Kansas City is the location of 341 of these properties and districts; they are listed here, while the remaining properties and districts, including all of the National Historic Landmarks, are listed separately.  The 5 properties in Kansas City outside of Jackson County appear on lists for their respective counties, while all of the properties and districts in the administratively separate Kansas City, Kansas appear on the list for Wyandotte County, Kansas.

Number of listings by region
Approximately half of Kansas City's properties and districts are located in the downtown, which for the purposes of this list is defined as being roughly bounded by the Missouri River to the north, 31st Street to the south, Troost Avenue to the east, and State Line Road to the west.

See also 
 List of National Historic Landmarks in Missouri
 National Register of Historic Places listings in Missouri

References